Mitchell van Rooijen (born 22 December 1998) is a Dutch professional footballer who plays as a defensive midfielder for Eerste Divisie club VVV-Venlo.

Club career

Utrecht
Van Rooijen was born in Utrecht, but moved to Houten with his parents at a young age. In 2008, he moved from local amateur club Delta Sports '95 to the youth academy of FC Utrecht. He signed his first youth contract with that club in 2015, before being promoted to the second team competing in the second-tier Eerste Divisie the following year, in 2016. On 5 August 2016 he made his professional debut for the team, starting on the opening day of the 2016–17 Eerste Divisie in a 4–1 away loss to NAC Breda at the Rat Verlegh Stadion. On 22 December 2016, his 18th birthday, he signed a contract extension with FC Utrecht until 2020, with an option for an additional year.

He scored a spectacular scorpion kick on 26 April 2019 in a league game for Jong Utrecht against Helmond Sport, joining a club of elite footballers who have scored this way in game, including Rafael van der Vaart, Zlatan Ibrahimović, Henrikh Mkhitaryan and Olivier Giroud.

In March 2020, the option was exercised by FC Utrecht, automatically extending the deal until 2021, and a few months later, in July 2020, he signed a new contract keeping him part of Utrecht until 2023. Earlier that year, on 17 January 2020, Van Rooijen, who had become team captain of Jong Utrecht, had made his debut for the first team in the Eredivisie in a 3–3 away draw against PEC Zwolle. Due to a number of injuries in the first team, head coach John van den Brom included Van Rooijen in the starting lineup that day, before replacing him in the 66th minute for Urby Emanuelson after suffering a groin injury.

Van Rooijen was sent on a season-long loan to Eerste Divisie club Excelsior on 4 August 2020. He would play regularly for the club, making 26 total appearances in which he scored once. After the season, he returned to Utrecht.

VVV-Venlo
Van Rooijen moved to VVV-Venlo on 26 July 2021, signing a two-year contract with an option for an extra season. He made his debut on the first matchday of the 2021–22 season, starting in a 2–2 home draw against NAC Breda. On 5 November 2021, he scored his first goal for the club, equalizing in the home match against Jong Ajax, which would eventually finish in a 3–1 loss. He made 26 total appearances in his first season with VVV, scoring six goals.

Career statistics

Club

References

External links
 

1998 births
Footballers from Utrecht (city)
Living people
Dutch footballers
Jong FC Utrecht players
FC Utrecht players
Excelsior Rotterdam players
VVV-Venlo players
Eerste Divisie players
Eredivisie players
Netherlands youth international footballers
Association football midfielders